Fashion House was an American nighttime soap opera that aired at 9:00PM Eastern/8:00PM Central Monday through Saturday on MyNetworkTV stations. The series premiered on September 5, 2006, and concluded on December 5, 2006. It was produced by Twentieth Television with directors David Hogan, Alex Hennech, Jim Slocum and Jeremy Stanford.

Fashion House focused on greed, lust and ambition surrounding a corporate takeover of the business's hottest company. It starred Bo Derek as the ruthless head of the business and Morgan Fairchild as her long-time arch-rival.

Fashion House is an adaptation in the original Cuban script "Salir de Noche" written by Euridice Charadian & Osvaldo Huerta and was sold to MyNetworkTV by InjausTV.

As of 2021, the entire series can be seen on TubiTV.

Production
Fashion House aired for a 78-episode run. MyNetworkTV episode aired it Monday through Friday for 13 weeks, with a "recap" show on Saturdays airing at 9 p.m. Eastern. It was based on the Cuban telenovela Salir de Noche ("Out in the Night"), produced by Miami firm XYSTUS.  MyNetworkTV originally planned to use the umbrella title Secrets, later changed to Secret Obsessions, for its telenovelas in the 9:00 p.m. ET timeslot, with Fashion House as its first installment.  While the show is set in Los Angeles, it was filmed at Stu Segall Productions in San Diego. Logo design was done by design director Chris Hoffman.

Its debut week saw modest viewership; an average 1.3 household rating and 2 share, slightly higher than its lead in, Desire, according to Nielsen. The second week dipped to 1.1 million viewers. During the next few weeks, ratings stabilized at a 0.6 rating.
National advertising spots sold for between $20,000 and $35,000 for a 30-second spot as of September 2006.

Cast

Theme 
The theme song played during the opening credits was Chesterwhites "Good At Being Bad".

Crossover
A later MyNetworkTV telenovela, American Heiress, made a brief reference to this show.  In episode 17, which aired on June 6, Jordan Wakefield says that "since Maria Gianni died you can't find a decent dress in a store."

International

Africa 
 In Cameroon the show airs on LTM TV: show time 7pm (East Africa Time) from Mondays to Fridays, with reruns on Saturdays (22pm) & Sundays (17pm).
 In Ghana, the show aires on Saturdays and Sundays at 4:00 pm.
 In Kenya, KTN airs the show Sundays at 10:30.
 In Togo, the show aired on Saturdays at 10:00 am.

Asia 
 In Hong Kong, China, Star World airs the show from Feb 6, 2007 weeknights at 10pm, plus weekdays and Saturday afternoons at 4.30pm.
  In Iran, GEM TV  at 6 pm
 In India, Star World aired it at 11 pm and at 4:30 pm next afternoon.
 In Israel, HOT3 finished airing on 11/10/07. Star World also aired the series.
 In Malaysia, Star World airs it at 10 p.m. from Monday to Friday.
 The series airs at 5:00 p.m. UTC, Saturday through Wednesday, in the Middle East on MBC 4.
 In Nepal. Star World aired the show on weeknights at 11:15 pm and recapped it at 2:45 am and on 4:45 the next afternoon.
 In Pakistan, Star World airs the show on weeknights at 11:00pm with recap on Sundays at 11pm.
 In the Philippines, the show airs in Star World
 In Sri Lanka, ARTv Wednesday @ 9.30 pm – 10.30 pm & Repeat on Friday @ 9.30 pm – 10.30 pm.
 In Turkey, Fox Life weekdays at 05:00pm.

Europe 
 In Belgium, Punt. aired the series Monday through Friday at 8pm
 In Bulgaria, bTV aired the series Monday through Friday at 6pm, with a "recap" show on Saturdays airing at 3pm. The series premiere was on January 1, 2007, and the last episode aired on March 27, 2007. Currently, reruns of the show can be seen on TV+.
 In Finland, MTV3 6 pm – 7 pm.
 In Italy, the series airs at 7:00 pm. from Monday to Friday on Sky Vivo. The series premiere was on March 12, 2007.
 In Ireland, TV3 airs it at 11:30 a.m. from Monday to Friday.
 In the Netherlands the show aired Monday – Friday 6.30pm on Tien until the station airing it was brought out by rival television network RTL 8. The show stopped airing on 17 August 2007, one day before the takeover.
 In Norway, TV2 Zebra
 In Portugal, the series airs from Monday to Friday on mornings (9:40 – 10:25) and late at night (2:55 – 3:40) on Fox Life.
 In Serbia, the series runs weekdays at 6pm on FOX.
 In Slovenia the show airs Weekdays at 5.45pm UTC+1 on TV3 Slovenia, reruns also Weekdays at 11.45am UTC+1. It premiered on November 6, 2007. More info: 
 In Spain, Cuatro started airing on September/17/07. 10:45 to 12:15 from Monday to Friday.
 In Sweden, Kanal 5 airs it at around 1:15 pm.

North America 
 In El Salvador, Canal 12, Wednesdays @ 7 pm.
 In Trinidad and Tobago, the show airs on CNMG on Saturdays and Sundays at 8:30 pm.

Oceania 
 In Australia, the complete series ran weekdays at 11am on the Seven Network in early 2007, and previously ran on Foxtel's W Channel and now is airing again at 4am.

South America 
 In Venezuela, Televen 3 pm – 4 pm.

Episodes

See also
 MyNetworkTV telenovelas

References

External links 
 

MyNetworkTV original programming
2006 telenovelas
2006 American television series debuts
2006 American television series endings
American telenovelas
American television series based on telenovelas
Fashion-themed television series
Television series by 20th Century Fox Television
Television shows set in Los Angeles